Conus nanus is a species of sea snail, a marine gastropod mollusk in the family Conidae, the cone snails and their allies.

These snails are predatory and venomous. They are capable of "stinging" humans, therefore live ones should be handled carefully or not at all.

Description
The size of an adult shell varies between 12 mm and 34 mm. The shell is coronated, with a rather depressed spire, granular striae towards the base. The color of the shell is white, under a thin, light yellowish brown epidermis, obsoletely maculated or occasionally spotted with chestnut. The base is violaceous.

Distribution
This species occurs in the Indian Ocean off the Mascarene Basin; in the Indo-Pacific Region off Hawaii, (Polynesia, Australia) South Africa

References

 Higo, S., Callomon, P. & Goto, Y. (1999). Catalogue and bibliography of the marine shell-bearing Mollusca of Japan. Osaka. : Elle Scientific Publications. 749 pp.
 Filmer R.M. (2001). A Catalogue of Nomenclature and Taxonomy in the Living Conidae 1758 – 1998. Backhuys Publishers, Leiden. 388pp.
 Tucker J.K. (2009). Recent cone species database. September 4, 2009 Edition
 Tucker J.K. & Tenorio M.J. (2009) Systematic classification of Recent and fossil conoidean gastropods. Hackenheim: Conchbooks. 296 pp.
 Severns, M. (2011). Shells of the Hawaiian Islands – The Sea Shells. Conchbooks, Hackenheim. 564 pp. 
 Puillandre N., Duda T.F., Meyer C., Olivera B.M. & Bouchet P. (2015). One, four or 100 genera? A new classification of the cone snails. Journal of Molluscan Studies. 81: 1–23

External links
 The Conus Biodiversity website
 Gastropods.com: Harmoniconus sponsalis var. nanus
 Cone Shells – Knights of the Sea

nanus
Gastropods described in 1833